Rathlevanagh is a townland in County Westmeath, Ireland.

Rathlevanagh is one of 8 townlands of the civil parish of Portnashangan in the barony of Corkaree in the Province of Leinster.

The neighbouring townlands are: Down and Knightswood to the north,
Loughanstown to the east and Portnashangan to the west.

In the 1911 census of Ireland there were 2 houses and 5 inhabitants in the townland.

References

External links
Rathlevanagh at the IreAtlas Townland Data Base
Rathlevanagh at Townlands.ie
Rathlevanagh at Logainm.ie

Townlands of County Westmeath